Lorna Slater (born 27 September 1975) is a Canadian politician in Scotland, who has served as Minister for Green Skills, Circular Economy and Biodiversity in the Scottish Government since 2021. She has served as co-leader of the Scottish Greens alongside Patrick Harvie since 2019, and is one of the first Green politicians in the UK to serve as a government minister. Slater has been a Member of the Scottish Parliament (MSP) for the Lothian region since 2021.

Born in Alberta, Canada, Slater moved to Scotland in 2000 and worked as an engineer in the renewable energy sector. She became politically involved in the Scottish Greens and was a candidate in the 2016 Scottish Parliament election, but failed to win a seat.

In 2019, Slater replaced Maggie Chapman as co-leader of the Scottish Greens in the co-leadership election. She was the candidate for the Edinburgh Northern and Leith constituency in the 2021 Scottish Parliament election. Although she failed to win, she was elected as an additional member for the Lothian region. Following a power-sharing agreement with the SNP, Slater was promoted to the Scottish Government as a junior minister in the third Sturgeon government.

Early life and engineering career
Lorna Slater was born in Calgary in the Canadian province of Alberta. She was educated at the Western Canada High School. From 1993 to 2000, she attended the University of British Columbia in Vancouver, where she gained a degree in electro-mechanical engineering design.

In 2000, a month after she was due to graduate, she purchased a one-way ticket to Glasgow and planned to travel across Europe for two years, but ended up staying in Scotland. After moving there, she worked as an engineer in the renewables sector, then later as a project manager.

In 2018, she was one of three women from Scotland awarded a place on the Homeward Bound international leadership development programme and this included a trip to Antarctica the following year, where she had studied the effects of climate change.

Early political career
Slater became politically involved during the run-up to the 2014 Scottish independence referendum, where she campaigned in favour of Scottish independence.

Slater has been an election candidate for the Scottish Greens several times. At the 2016 Scottish Parliament election, the party named her third on the Lothian list, while in 2017 general election, she was one of only three candidates fielded by the Scottish Greens, standing for Edinburgh North and Leith.

In April 2019, in a City of Edinburgh Council by-election for the Leith Walk ward, she took a 25.5 per cent share of first preference votes, finishing second. She was co-convener of the Scottish Greens Operations Committee when she was named second on the list of the party's candidates for the 2019 European Parliament election.

Also in 2019, Slater came third in the selection for the Green Party's Lothian list. Alison Johnstone won 191 first votes, Andy Wightman 133 votes and Slater 36 votes.

Co-leader of the Scottish Greens

Co-leadership election bid 
Changes to the Scottish Greens' constitution meant the positions of co-conveners were abolished in favour of the newly established positions of co-leaders. In the run up to the 2019 Scottish Greens co-leadership election, Slater announced her candidacy via Twitter. When announcing her candidacy, she stated that the party was ready for a "fresh new start." Upon winning, she said that she wanted to get more women and non-binary people elected, and to gain more seats than ever before at the 2021 Scottish Parliament election.

On 1 August 2019, the results were announced and Slater replaced Maggie Chapman as the female co-leader (formerly co-convenor). She gained 30.2%, coming second place. She is serving alongside Patrick Harvie for a two-year term. As Slater was not a member of the Scottish Parliament, Alison Johnstone served as co-leader of the Scottish Greens within the Scottish Parliament, until the 2021 Scottish Parliament election.

2021 election campaign 

Slater became a prominent figure in the lead up to the Scottish parliamentary election, with her being featured in TV Debates and interviews. In the first televised debate on BBC Scotland, Slater urged action on climate change, stating; "Science tells us we have less than 10 years before the climate breakdown goes past the point of no return. The time to act is now." She also reinstated how the Scottish Greens would support legislation on another referendum on Scottish independence within the "next term of parliament".

In the 2021 election to the 6th Scottish Parliament, the Scottish Greens saw their best result ever. The party gained 8.1% of votes on the regional list, earning two additional seats. As the Scottish National Party was one seat away from a majority, the Greens' gain in the election created a pro-independence majority. Slater predicted the Greens "will have more influence than ever".

Member of the Scottish Parliament; 2021 to present 
Slater stood as the Greens' candidate for the Edinburgh Northern and Leith constituency in the 2021 Scottish Parliament election. She gained 13.1% of the votes, but failed to win the seat, coming third. Although Slater was unsuccessful in winning the constituency, she was second on the party list vote for the Lothian region, and was elected as an additional member.

Slater is a member of the Scottish Parliament's Economy and Fair Work Committee. She is the Scottish Greens' Spokesperson on Economic Recovery and Green Industrial Strategy.

Maiden speech 

On 18 May 2021, Slater delivered her maiden speech to the Scottish Parliament. She called on all the parties to "work constructively and across party lines" to make transformative change. She also called on for the parliament to build a case for Scotland to leave the United Kingdom and believes the nation should vote again in another independence referendum.

COVID-19 rules breach 
On 10 June 2021, a picture was shared on social media which showed Slater and other members of the Greens, including co-leader Patrick Harvie and MSP for West Scotland Ross Greer, breaching social distancing measures. At the time only three households were allowed meet indoors. However, The Scottish Sun reported that Slater, Harvie, Greer and another Green Party member were pictured at a bar in Edinburgh. Slater responded, “This was an honest mistake, we're kicking ourselves and we apologise unreservedly".

Bute House Agreement
In August 2021 after weeks of talks, she was at Bute House with co-leader Patrick Harvie and First Minister Nicola Sturgeon to announce a power-sharing agreement that would see the Green party in government for the first time in the United Kingdom. There was no agreement on oil and gas exploration. As part of the agreement the Green Party would have two ministers in government.

Junior minister; 2021 to present 
On 30 August 2021, Slater was appointed as a junior minister in the Scottish Government as Minister for Green Skills, Circular Economy and Biodiversity. She and Harvie are the first Green Party politicians in both Scottish and UK political history to serve in government.

In November 2021 Slater announced that a flagship recycling scheme for drinks containers had been delayed yet again. Although prior to her election Slater had told voters the scheme “needs doing”, in government she said it was proving too tricky. Greenpeace said such, "a shambolic delay to the long awaited deposit return scheme is embarrassing for a government which loves to shout about its green credentials."

Personal life 
Slater has autism and has written about living with the condition. She is also a hobby aerialist and has a pet bearded dragon called Bellamy, named after David Bellamy.

References

External links
 
 Lorna Slater's profile page on the Scottish Greens' official website

 

1970s births
Year of birth missing (living people)
Living people
Canadian emigrants to Scotland
Politicians from Calgary
Leaders of the Scottish Green Party
Female members of the Scottish Parliament
Members of the Scottish Parliament 2021–2026
Scottish Green Party MSPs
University of British Columbia alumni
Ministers of the Scottish Government
People on the autism spectrum